Mónica María Encinas Bardem (born May 4, 1964) is a Spanish film actress, daughter of actress Pilar Bardem and sister of actors Carlos and Javier Bardem.  Some of her films are Kika (1993), Más que amor, frenesí (1996) and Boca a boca (1995). She also manages the family restaurants La Bardemcilla and La Bardemcilla de Santa Ana in Madrid, but it was closed due to economic problems in 2013.

References

External links

1964 births
Living people
Actresses from Madrid
20th-century Spanish actresses
Spanish film actresses
Spanish television actresses
Monica